Montenegro competed at the 2022 World Aquatics Championships in Budapest, Hungary from 17 June to 3 July.

Swimming

Montenegro entered two swimmers.

Men

Women

Water polo

Summary

Men's tournament

Team roster

Group play

Playoffs

Quarterfinals

5–8th place semifinals

Seventh place game

References

Nations at the 2022 World Aquatics Championships
Montenegro at the World Aquatics Championships
2022 in Montenegrin sport